Rybczewice  is a village in Świdnik County, Lublin Voivodeship, in eastern Poland. It is the seat of the gmina (administrative district) called Gmina Rybczewice.

The village has a population of 840.

References

Rybczewice